Elloughton is a village in the East Riding of Yorkshire, England. It lies on the southern end of the Yorkshire Wolds. It is conjoined with Brough that lies to the south-east, with which it forms the civil parish of Elloughton-cum-Brough.

Elloughton lies within the Parliamentary constituency of Haltemprice and Howden.
The church dedicated to St Mary was designated a Grade II* listed building in 1968 and is now recorded in the National Heritage List for England, maintained by Historic England. 

In 1823, Elloughton was in the Wapentake of Harthill, a part of the Liberty of St Peter's. The patron of the Church of St Mary was the York Minster prebendary of Wetwang. Within the village was a Methodist and a Calvinist chapel. The village had a population of 318, with occupations including six farmers, two carpenters, two tailors, a blacksmith, a shoemaker, and a bricklayer. Also directory-listed were three yeomen, a school master, a gentlewoman, and a curate. Once a week two carriers operated between the village and Hull.

References

External links

Villages in the East Riding of Yorkshire